The Global Reporting Centre (GRC) is an independent news organization focused on innovating global journalism, based out of the University of British Columbia in Vancouver, British Columbia, Canada. Its model works by pairing scholars, leading journalists and news organizations to cover neglected stories around the world. Founded by Peter W. Klein, it grew from the International Reporting Program based at the University of British Columbia Graduate School of Journalism.

Projects
Currently, the Global Reporting Centre has 18 ongoing news projects. One of them is shortlisted for a $2.5 million grant that would enable the nonprofit to cover supply chains around the world, in partnership with news organizations such as The New York Times. The organization has also partnered with the Center for Investigative Reporting to look at a digital dumping ground, in China. Most recently, the Global Reporting Centre received funding from the Aga Khan Foundation to profile the efforts to wipe out Rh Disease and explore it as a public health issue.

Awards and recognition
The Global Reporting Centre has won numerous awards for excellence in journalism in a range of categories. It has won a Sigma Delta Chi Award and the Edward R. Murrow Award, which were given in 2014, for the documentary China's Generation Green. It has also won the Online Journalism Awards, the Digital Publishing Award, a Webby Award honoree, and longlisted for the One World Media Awards; these awards were given in 2016, for the documentary Out of the Shadows

External links
Nieman Reports, Harvard: Fostering a Grassroots Approach to International Reporting
Poynter: Global Reporting Centre, a new nonprofit, wants to tell the world’s biggest untold stories
MediaShift: Journalists and Academics Collaborating? It’s Paying Off for Investigative Reports in Canada
Forbes: Why '60 Minutes' Producers Are Leaving To Start Their Own Non-Profits

Further reading
Center for Investigative Reporting 
Investigative Journalism

References

Organizations based in Vancouver
Investigative journalism